Shampur is a village in Jalandhar district of Punjab State, India. The village is administrated by a sarpanch who is an elected representative of village.

Transport 

References 

Villages in Jalandhar district